Bully for Bugs is a 1953 Warner Bros. Looney Tunes theatrical cartoon short directed by Chuck Jones and written by Michael Maltese. The cartoon was released on August 8, 1953, and stars Bugs Bunny.

Synopsis 
Tunneling his way to the Coachella Valley for the "big carrot festival therein," Bugs Bunny gets lost, and wanders into a Mexican bullring in the middle of a bullfight between Toro the Bull and a very scared matador. Bugs looks at his map and famously declares: "I knew I shoulda taken that left toin at Albukoikee". As he asks the matador for directions, the matador escapes into the stands, leaving Bugs to fend for himself against Toro. After irritating Bugs and getting a slap for "steamin' up [his] tail," Toro chalks up the points of his horns like a pool cue and rams the rabbit out of the bullring. As he sails into the air, a furious Bugs decides to exact revenge on Toro and says his other famous line: "Of course you realize this means war".

Toro takes his applause for claiming his latest victim (and pushes a bead across a scoring wire, as in billiards), but it is short-lived because Bugs re-enters the bullring in matador garb. Bugs defeats Toro using an anvil hidden behind his cape. While Toro is still dazed from his collision, and accompanied by a lively underscore of "La Cucaracha", Bugs makes the bull follow the cape to a bull shield; Toro's horns pierce it. Bugs bends the horns down like nails and, thinking he has got Toro at bay, makes fun of him using puns ("What a gulli-bull, what a nin-cow-poop"), unaware that the bull can detach his horns and strike back. Toro proceeds to bash Bugs in the head, which knocks him unconscious.

While Toro sharpens his horns, Bugs interrupts him by placing an elastic band around the horns and using it as a giant slingshot to smack him in the face with a boulder. As Bugs accepts accolades from the crowd, Toro charges, catching the rabbit in the posterior and pushing him through a wall.  Bugs then returns, this time wearing a large sombrero, doing a little dance, and slapping Toro on the face in tempo to the tune of "Las Chiapanecas". Toro tries to go toward him twice but is slapped each time. Bugs dances more and then disappears under the sombrero, but not before honking Toro's nose.

While Toro once again sharpens his horns (this time with an angry face), Bugs has prepared a booby trap for the bull, composed of a double-barreled shotgun hidden behind the cape. Toro charges the cape and somehow the shotgun previously in Bugs's hand enters Toro's body and fills his tail. When he flicks his tail and it hits the ground, a bullet fires from each of his horns, one at a time. Taking advantage of that, Toro chases Bugs, shooting at him, but eventually runs out of bullets. Toro "reloads" by swallowing several "elephant bullets" (with explosive heads), but when he attempts to shoot again, he instead explodes.

Bugs taunts Toro once again by calling him, among other things, an "im-bess-ile" and an "ultra-maroon", but realizes that he is trapped in front of barred gates. As Toro races toward him, Bugs pretends to await certain death (by writing a will and saying his prayers), and at the last second, opens the gates like a garage door, sending Toro out of the bullring and into the horizon. Furious, Toro races back to the bullring, not anticipating that Bugs has laid out on his path a Rube Goldberg–like contraption of axle grease, a ramp, and some platforms. The grease and ramp send Toro airborne over some glue, a sheet of sandpaper, a protruding matchstick, and a barrel of TNT which explodes when Toro flies by. Still in the air and in shock, Toro finally crashes into a wooden bull shield.

The cartoon ends with the unconscious bull's hindquarters sticking out of the shield, and the victorious Bugs holding up the cape with the words "THE END" written on it.

Development 
In his biography Chuck Amuck, Chuck Jones claims that he made this cartoon after producer Eddie Selzer burst into Jones' workspace one day and announced, for no readily apparent reason, that there was nothing funny about bullfighting and no cartoons about it were to be made. Since Selzer had, in Jones' opinion, consistently proven himself to be wrong about absolutely everything (having once barred Jones from doing any cartoons featuring Pepé Le Pew, on the grounds that he perceived them as not being funny, which led to Jones and Maltese to do For Scent-imental Reasons, which won an Oscar, which Selzer accepted), the only possible option was to make the cartoon. The sounds of the crowd and the bull are recorded from a genuine bullfighting crowd in Barcelona, Spain. The boulder to the face gag was reused from Rabbit Punch five years earlier, which was also directed by Chuck Jones.

Reception
Darrell Van Citters writes, "This film hits squarely in director Chuck Jones' sweet spot and features most of the creative team we've come to associate with his best work... Both the writing and directing are self-assured, and there is no wasted effort anywhere in the film. Jones was a master of timing and the expressive hold. Often his holds would be followed up by the movement of one body part, such as an eyebrow raise, making the statement even more effective. In his best films, such as Bully for Bugs, his timing revealed character, making the moment all the funnier."

Home media
 VHS: Bugs Bunny's Wacky Adventures
 VHS: From Hare to Eternity
 Laserdisc: Bugs Bunny: Winner by a Hare
 DVD: Looney Tunes Golden Collection: Volume 1
 DVD/Blu-ray: Looney Tunes Platinum Collection: Volume 3
 DVD: Looney Tunes: Bugs Bunny And Friends (Full Frame)

References

External links 

 

1950s English-language films
1953 animated films
1953 short films
1950s Warner Bros. animated short films
Looney Tunes shorts
Short films directed by Chuck Jones
Films set in Mexico
Bullfighting films
Films scored by Carl Stalling
Bugs Bunny films
1953 comedy films
Films with screenplays by Michael Maltese
American animated short films
Animated films about rabbits and hares
Films about cattle